Lycopteridae is an extinct family of freshwater osteoglossomorph ray-finned fishes.

Genera
 Lycoptera Müller, 1848
 Aokiichthys Yabumoto 1994
 Changichthys Su 1991
 Yungkangichthys Chang and Chou 1974

Description
These ray-finned fishes were small, often only a finger's length, with small, almost circular scales.

Distribution
They occurred in East Asian rivers and lakes from the Jurassic to Cretaceous. Fossils of these fishes have been found in China and Japan.

References

 Arno Hermann Müller: Lehrbuch der Paläozoologie. Band III, Vertebraten, Teil 1. Gustav Fischer Verlag, 1985
 Joseph S. Nelson: Fishes of the World. John Wiley & Sons, 2006, 
 V.N. Yakovlev Systematics of the family Lycopteridae International Geology Review - Volume 8,  Issue 1, 1966

External links 
 
 
  The Paleobiology Database
 Helsinki.fi

Prehistoric ray-finned fish families
Jurassic bony fish
Cretaceous bony fish
Freshwater fish
Jurassic first appearances
Cretaceous extinctions
Osteoglossomorpha